The Electronic Entertainment Expo 2015 (E3 2015) was the 21st E3 held. The event took place at the Los Angeles Convention Center in Los Angeles, California. It took place from June 16 to June 18, 2015, with 52,200 total attendees.

Major exhibitors at the convention included Activision Blizzard, Atlus, Bethesda Softworks, Electronic Arts, Microsoft Studios, Nintendo, Nvidia, Sony Computer Entertainment, Square Enix and Ubisoft.

While E3 is a closed event to only members of the video game industry and the media, the Entertainment Software Association (ESA) allowed access to the event from gamers for the first time by distributing 5,000 tickets the various exhibitors that they subsequently distributed to their fans.

Press conferences

Oculus
Oculus VR hosted a pre-E3 press conference on June 11, 2015 at 10:00 a.m. During the conference, Oculus Rift's final design was revealed. Oculus Touch, a controller for the Rift, as well as exclusives, including Damaged Core from High Voltage Software, VR Sports Challenge from Sanzaru Games, Chronos from Gunfire Games and Edge of Nowhere from Insomniac Games were announced.

Bethesda
Bethesda hosted its first ever E3 press conference on June 14 at 7:00 p.m. During the conference, Bethesda Softworks revealed Fallout Shelter,  Dishonored: Definitive Edition, Dishonored 2, as well as The Elder Scrolls: Legends, a card game set within the Elder Scrolls universe. Release windows, trailers and gameplay demo were released for Fallout 4, Doom and BattleCry.

Microsoft
Microsoft hosted a press conference on June 15 at 9:30 a.m.  During the conference, Microsoft announced ReCore, Xbox One backward compatibility, a new Elite controller, Plants vs. Zombies: Garden Warfare 2, Dark Souls III, Ashen, Beyond Eyes, Ion, Rare Replay, Sea of Thieves and Gears of War: Ultimate Edition and showed footage of Halo 5: Guardians, Forza Motorsport 6, Fallout 4 with mod support, Tom Clancy's The Division, Tom Clancy's Rainbow Six Siege, Gigantic, Tacoma, Cuphead, Rise of the Tomb Raider, Fable Legends, a version of Minecraft compatible with Microsoft HoloLens and Gears of War 4.

Electronic Arts
Electronic Arts hosted a press conference on June 15 at 1:00 p.m. The conference lasted for an hour.  During the conference, Electronic Arts announced Mass Effect Andromeda, showed gameplay of Need for Speed, announced the Star Wars: The Old Republic – Knights of the Fallen Empire, Unravel, showed gameplay of Plants vs. Zombies: Garden Warfare 2, announced NHL 16, NBA Live 16, Star Wars: Galaxy of Heroes, Minions Paradise, showed footage of FIFA 16, showed gameplay of Mirror's Edge Catalyst, showed footage of Madden NFL 16 and showed gameplay of Star Wars Battlefront.

Ubisoft
Ubisoft hosted a press conference on June 15 at 3:00 p.m. During the conference, Ubisoft announced South Park: The Fractured But Whole, a new IP titled For Honor, The Crew Wild Run, Trials Fusion: Awesome Level Max, Anno 2205, Just Dance 2016, Trackmania Turbo and Tom Clancy's Ghost Recon Wildlands and showed gameplay of Tom Clancy's The Division, Tom Clancy's Rainbow Six Siege and Assassin's Creed Syndicate.

Sony
Sony hosted a press conference on June 15 at 6:00 p.m.  During the conference, Sony re-announced The Last Guardian, announced a new IP titled Horizon Zero Dawn, Hitman, Dreams, Firewatch, Destiny: The Taken King, Final Fantasy VII Remake, and Shenmue III, in addition to showing footage of No Man's Sky, Assassin's Creed Syndicate, Batman: Arkham Knight, Call of Duty: Black Ops III, Disney Infinity 3.0, Star Wars: Battlefront, Ratchet & Clank and Uncharted 4: A Thief's End.

Nintendo
Nintendo, for a third consecutive E3, decided to forego hosting a traditional press conference in favor of a Nintendo Digital Event—a pre-recorded video presentation that was streamed online on June 16 at 9:00 a.m. with an accompanying press release. Prior to E3, Nintendo also held an event, the Nintendo World Championships 2015 (a competition in which a group of players participated in a multi-round competition across multiple Nintendo games), and also featured the announcement of new content for Super Smash Bros. for Nintendo 3DS and Wii U, EarthBound Beginnings, Blast Ball, and new gameplay of Super Mario Maker as part of the competition's finale.  During the Digital Event, Nintendo announced Star Fox Zero, Amiibo figures compatible with Skylanders: SuperChargers, The Legend of Zelda: Tri Force Heroes, Hyrule Warriors Legends, Metroid Prime: Federation Force, Fire Emblem Fates, Tokyo Mirage Sessions ♯FE, showed footage of Xenoblade Chronicles X, announced Animal Crossing: Happy Home Designer, Animal Crossing: Amiibo Festival, showed footage of Yoshi's Woolly World, announced Yo-kai Watch, Mario & Luigi: Paper Jam, Mario Tennis: Ultra Smash and showed footage of Super Mario Maker.

Square Enix
Square Enix hosted a press conference on June 16 at 10:00 a.m.  During the conference, Square Enix announced Nier: Automata under the provisional title Nier New Project, Lara Croft Go, Kingdom Hearts Unchained χ, Star Ocean: Integrity and Faithlessness and a new IP titled I Am Setsuna and showed footage of Just Cause 3, Rise of the Tomb Raider, Kingdom Hearts III, World of Final Fantasy, Hitman and Deus Ex: Mankind Divided. Announcement footage of Final Fantasy VII Remake was revealed as part of Sony's presentation.

PC Gaming Show
A webcast focusing on PC gaming was held on June 16 at 5:00 p.m. by gaming magazine PC Gamer and AMD, and hosted by Sean Plott. Representatives of studios including Blizzard Entertainment, Microsoft Studios, Bohemia Interactive, Paradox Interactive, Obsidian Entertainment, as well as Tripwire Interactive, ArenaNet, The Creative Assembly, Frictional Games, Frontier Developments, SCS Software, Splash Damage, Square Enix, Cloud Imperium Games and Devolver Digital made appearances. Rising Storm 2: Vietnam,  a PC port of Killer Instinct, American Truck Simulator, a Pillars of Eternity expansion known as The White March, Planet Coaster and an expansion of Arma 3 known as Tanoa were announced, and there was footage shown of Killing Floor 2, Star Citizen, Deus Ex: Human Revolution, Total War: Warhammer, Fable Legends, Gigantic, Gears of War: Ultimate Edition, Eve Valkyrie, Ion, Strafe, the Guild Wars 2 expansion Heart of Thorns, Hitman, Soma, Day Z, Take on Mars, BlueStreak, Enter the Gungeon and No Man's Sky.

List of notable exhibitors
This is a list of major video game exhibitors who made appearances at E3 2015.

 2K Games
 505 Games
 Alienware
 Activision Blizzard
 Atlus
 Bandai Namco Entertainment
 Bethesda Softworks
 Capcom
 Crytek
 Deep Silver
 Disney Interactive
 Double Fine Productions
 Electronic Arts
 Focus Home Interactive
 Iron Galaxy Studios
 Mattel
 Marvelous USA 
 Microsoft Studios
 Natsume
 Nintendo
 Nvidia
 Oculus VR
 Razer Inc.
 Sony Computer Entertainment
 Square Enix
 Take-Two Interactive
 Team17
 Telltale Games
 Turtle Beach Systems
 Ubisoft
 Warner Bros. Interactive Entertainment
 Wizards of the Coast

List of featured games
This is a list of notable titles that appeared at E3 2015.

Notes

References

2015 in Los Angeles
2015 in video gaming
2015
June 2015 events in the United States